Gleason's Pictorial Drawing-Room Companion was a 19th-century illustrated periodical published in Boston, Massachusetts from 1851–1859. The magazine was founded by Frederick Gleason in 1851. The publication name was changed to Ballou's Pictorial Drawing-Room Companion in 1855, after managing editor Maturin Murray Ballou bought out the interest of Gleason. The magazine absorbed the Illustrated News of New York in 1853. It ceased publication in 1859.

The Pictorial featured artists such as Winslow Homer, and authors such as: Giddings H. Ballou, Susan H. Blaisdell, Alice Carey, Sylvanus Cobb, Jr., Sophronia Currier, Mrs. S.P. Doughty, Francis A. Durivage, Aglaus Forrester, Mrs. H.C. Gardner, Joseph Holt Ingraham, Grace Lee, Mary A. Lowell, Mary L. Meany, Ellen Alice Moriarty, Arthur Morton, Frances P. Pepperell, Mary E. Robinson, M.V. St. Leon, Frederick Ward Saunders, Sue M. Scott, Maurice Silingsby, Frederick Stanhope, Horace B. Staniford, John Thornberry, Winnie Woodfern, and Joseph Wolf.

Images

References

Further reading
 Gleason's Pictorial Drawing-Room Companion. v.1 (1851); v.2 (1852); v.3 (1852); v.4 (1853); v.5-6 (1853–54).
 Ballou's Pictorial Drawing-Room Companion. v.7-8 (1854–55); v.9-10 (1855–56); v.11-12 (1856–57); v.13-14 (1857–58); v.15-16 (1858–59); v.17 (1859).

External links

 An index of illustrations by artist Winslow Homer that appeared in Ballou's Pictorial

19th century in Boston
1851 establishments in Massachusetts
1859 disestablishments in the United States
Cultural history of Boston
Defunct magazines published in the United States
Financial District, Boston
Magazines established in 1851
Magazines disestablished in 1859
Magazines published in Boston